This family represents a structured region around the Rous sarcoma virus (RSV) primer binding site (PBS). This region is known to be required for the efficient initiation of reverse transcription.

References

External links 

 

Cis-regulatory RNA elements